Castle Junction is a locality where the northern extent of the Banff–Windermere Highway (Highway 93) intersects with the Trans-Canada Highway (Highway 1), the Bow River, and Bow Valley Parkway (Highway 1A) in Banff National Park, Alberta. It is named after the nearby Castle Mountain, clearly visible from the junction.

Work started here in 1910 on the Auto Route of the Great Divide, a project to build a highway across the Rocky Mountains, when construction began on a road from Castle Junction to Banff. Following an interruption caused by the outbreak of World War I, construction wrapped up in 1923 when the newly constructed road between Calgary and Banff was joined to the Windermere Highway via the road between Castle Junction and Banff.

Prime Minister Mackenzie King changed the name of Castle Mountain to Mount Eisenhower in 1946 to honour the World War II general Dwight D. Eisenhower. Correspondingly, Castle Junction was called Eisenhower Junction. Castle Mountain was officially restored to its original name in 1979, at which time Eisenhower Junction was also renamed Castle Junction.

A group of lodges and the Castle Mountain campground are located within a kilometre of the junction. Several hiking trails are available in the vicinity. The trailhead for hikes to Silverton Falls and Rockbound Lake is located approximately 200 metres east of Castle Junction. The remains of Silver City, a 19th-century settlement founded by prospectors at the base of Castle Mountain, are located nearby. Also nearby is the site of the Castle Mountain Internment Camp used during World War I.

References 

Banff National Park
Localities in Improvement District No. 9